The Duckworth-Williams House is a historic house at 103 South College Street in Siloam Springs, Arkansas.  It is a two-story stuccoed brick building, with a side gable roof that has a wide shed-roof dormer on the front.  The roof extends across the front porch, which is supported by four stuccoed brick columns.  The side walls of the house have half-timbered stucco finish.  Built , this is the only Tudor Revival house in Siloam Springs.

The house was listed on the National Register of Historic Places in 1988.

See also
National Register of Historic Places listings in Benton County, Arkansas

References

Houses on the National Register of Historic Places in Arkansas
Tudor Revival architecture in Arkansas
Houses completed in 1910
Houses in Siloam Springs, Arkansas
National Register of Historic Places in Benton County, Arkansas